Ene Riisna (born 27 June 1938) is an Estonian-born American television producer. She is known for her work on the American news show 20/20.

Early life and education
Ene Riisna was born in Tallinn, Estonia to politician Eduard Riisna and his wife Olga. Her family fled to Sweden in September 1944 when the Soviets occupied Estonia.

Riisna earned an Honors degree in English Language and Literature from the University of Toronto, University College. She briefly worked, successfully, as a fashion model in Toronto and London, England, then returned to Toronto and  became a producer-director for Canadian Broadcasting Corporation in Toronto, then a freelancer for the BBC in London.

Broadcasting
In 1970, Riisna's first job in network television in America was the executive producer of a new morning program, "Woman", for the CBS station in New York. The appointment made her one of the first women to create and produce a television news program.  Later she produced documentaries for NBC and PBS and wrote magazine articles including for MS magazine.

Riisna became a producer of the well-known news show 20/20 at ABC News. Over the course of the next two decades she produced a series of Emmy Award winning stories, many Barbara Walter’s high profile interviews  (Margaret Thatcher, Boris Yeltsen, Nancy Reagan, Barbra Streisand  and others.)  For her work she was awarded over a dozen major awards including two Emmys, a Television Academy General Achievement Award, and Columbia School of Journalism's  prestigious Dupont Award. Her subjects included an investigation of the effects of the use Agent Orange in Vietnam and the story of the Zumwalt family.

Riisna also produced and directed documentary films for ABC News with anchor Peter Jennings as host.
 
Presently Riisna, retired from 20/20, works with her husband James L. Greenfield who heads the Independent Journalism Foundation, which he created in 1990 for the study of journalism, and which has centers throughout Eastern Europe, Vietnam and Cambodia.

References

External links
Independent Journalism Foundation

1938 births
Living people
American television producers
American women television producers
People from Tallinn
Estonian emigrants to Sweden
Estonian emigrants to the United States
Estonian World War II refugees
University of Toronto alumni
21st-century American women